The Sanpel Cave bent-toed gecko (Cyrtodactylus sanpelensis) is a species of gecko that is endemic to Asia. The specific epithet, sanpelensis, is a noun in apposition in reference to the type locality of Sanpel Cave. This species of gecko is widely distributed across southeast Asia, including Myanmar and Thailand.

References 

Cyrtodactylus
Reptiles described in 2017